Teanaway Community Forest is a state owned  dual-use community forest and recreation area in the central Washington Cascades near Cle Elum. It was created through a public-private partnership involving Forterra and both Washington Department of Fish and Wildlife and Washington Department of Natural Resources acting towards the Yakima Basin Integrated Plan. When the land purchase from a private timber company was made in September 2013, it was described as the single largest transaction in Washington state in the past 45 years. The forest is about the size of the city of Seattle,  to the west.

DNR managers have requested the state legislature to pay for state-owned land physically within the community forest's boundaries to be administratively transferred into the community forest. Unless it is transferred, the trust lands must be logged to raise funds for Washington schools.

References

Sources
 

  updated 2018

External links
 (Washington DNR)
Trail maps and information, Evergreen Mountain Bike Alliance

2013 establishments in Washington (state)
Washington (state) state forests
Protected areas of Kittitas County, Washington